The Women's 3000 metre relay in short track speed skating at the 1994 Winter Olympics took place on 24 February at the Hamar Olympic Amphitheatre.

Results

Semifinals
The semifinals were held on 24 February. The top two teams in each semifinal qualified for the A final, while the third and fourth place teams advanced to the B Final.

Semifinal 1

Semifinal 2

Finals
The four qualifying teams competed in Final A, while four others raced in Final B.

Final A

Final B

References

Women's short track speed skating at the 1994 Winter Olympics
Skat